David Edge (born November 12, 1954 in Blackpool, Lancashire, United Kingdom) is a former long-distance runner, who represented Canada at two consecutive Summer Olympics in the men's marathon.

Biography
In Blackpool, he had been a policeman. He moved to Canada in 1981, and joined the Royal Canadian Mounted Police.

At the 1984 Summer Olympics in Los Angeles, California he did not finish. Four years later in Seoul, South Korea he finished in 67th place.

He is Jewish, and competed in the 1981 Maccabiah Games, winning a silver medal in the 10,000 m and a bronze medal in the mini-marathon, and in the 1989 Maccabiah Games. Edge won the silver medal at the 1986 Commonwealth Games in the marathon, behind Australia's Robert de Castella.

In 1984, he won the Ottawa Race Weekend marathon, and was the Canadian national marathon champion.

A resident of Newport Beach, California USA, Edge is married to Ireland's former long-distance runner Carey May.

Achievements

See also
List of Canadian Track and Field Championships winners
List of Commonwealth Games medallists in athletics (men)
List of marathon national champions (men)

References

External links
 
 
 
 
 
 

1954 births
Living people
Athletes (track and field) at the 1984 Summer Olympics
Athletes (track and field) at the 1988 Summer Olympics
British police officers
Canadian male long-distance runners
English emigrants to Canada
Naturalized citizens of Canada
Olympic track and field athletes of Canada
Sportspeople from Blackpool
Track and field athletes from Ontario
Athletes (track and field) at the 1986 Commonwealth Games
Commonwealth Games silver medallists for Canada
World Athletics Championships athletes for Canada
Commonwealth Games medallists in athletics
Jewish male athletes (track and field)
Maccabiah Games medalists in athletics
Maccabiah Games silver medalists for Canada
Maccabiah Games bronze medalists for Canada
Competitors at the 1981 Maccabiah Games
Competitors at the 1989 Maccabiah Games
Royal Canadian Mounted Police officers
Medallists at the 1986 Commonwealth Games